David & Layla is a 2005 independent film directed by Jay Jonroy.

Plot 
Inspired by a true story, sparks fly when a Jew and a Kurdish Muslim fall in love in New York. David (David Moscow), TV host of "Sex & Happiness", becomes smitten with the voluptuous Layla (Shiva Rose) - a mysterious, sensual dancer who turns out to be a refugee from Kurdistan, fleeing from Saddam's regime. David's reckless pursuit of Layla sets off an unveiling of the similarities and contrasts of their ancient cultures. His lust grows into love as he discovers in stunning Layla a sensitive, intelligent war survivor with a rich culture that echoes his own. But their families are dead set against their unlikely romance. Faced with deportation, Layla must choose: David or Dr. Ahmad? Will David and Layla follow their hearts and blast through centuries of religious animosity?

Written, produced, and directed by Jay Jonroy aka J.J. Alani, this film was inspired by the true story of the Kurdish Muslim-Jewish couple Alwan Jaff and her husband David Ruby who now live in Paris. Both appear in cameo roles in the film.

Cast
 David Moscow as David Fine
 Shiva Rose as Layla
 Callie Thorne as Abby
 Peter Van Wagner
 Polly Adams
 Will Janowitz as Woody Fine
 Anna George as Zina, Uncle Al's Wife
 Ed Chemaly
 Alexander Blaise
 Tibor Feldman as Rabbi Rabinovich

Reception 
The Washington Post called it "a frothy little romantic comedy." Variety described it as "an earnest, frequently funny comedy." Film Journal International said "the picture takes its time in developing momentum; once attained, it becomes a watchable, optimistic cri de coeur."

References

External links 
 
 Official Trailer David & Layla on Youtube
 

2005 independent films
2000s English-language films
2000s American films
2005 films
2005 romantic comedy films
American independent films
American romantic comedy films
American interfaith romance films
Fictional couples
Islamic and Jewish interfaith dialogue